ZNY-FM is a Caribbean music radio station in Nassau, Bahamas.

External links 
 

Radio stations in the Bahamas
Caribbean music
Radio stations established in 1999
1999 establishments in the Bahamas